The shinobue (kanji: 篠笛; also called takebue (kanji: 竹笛) in the context of Japanese traditional arts) is a Japanese transverse flute or fue that has a high-pitched sound. It is found in hayashi and nagauta ensembles, and plays important roles in noh and kabuki theatre music. It is heard in Shinto music such as kagura-den and in traditional Japanese folk songs. There are two styles: uta (song) and hayashi (festival). The uta is properly tuned to the Western scale, and can be played in ensembles or as a solo instrument.

See also
Ryuteki
Bamboo musical instruments

External links
Ron Korb's Asian Flute Gallery (features description and drawing of the Shinobue and other Japanese flutes)
Syoji Yamaguchi's web site on Japanese transverse flutes (features articles on making and playing of the Shinobue and other Japanese transverse flutes: yokobue or fue)
Japanese Traditional Music

Side-blown flutes
Japanese musical instruments
Bamboo flutes
Seven tone hole wind instruments